Conrath is a surname. Notable people with the surname include:

 Jean-Marie Conrath (born 1952), French Olympic long-distance runner
 Matthew Conrath (born 1989), American football defensive end
 Paul Conrath (1896–1979), German general during World War II
 Theodore Conrath (1920–1995), American painter, sculptor, and teacher
 Walter J. Conrath (1907–1942), American philatelist

See also
 Conrath, Wisconsin, village in Rusk County
 Rudolf Bernhard Conrath (1901–1962), Swiss comedian, radio personality, and stage and film actor